Minuscule 279 (in the Gregory-Aland numbering), ε 293 (Soden), is a Greek minuscule manuscript of the New Testament, on parchment. Palaeographically it has been assigned to the 12th century. 
It has full marginalia.

Description 

The codex contains a complete text of the four Gospels on 250 parchment leaves. The text is written in one column per page, in 23-26 lines per page.

There is also a division according to the Ammonian Sections (in Mark 241 Sections, the last in 16:20), with references to the Eusebian Canons (written below Ammonian Section numbers).

The manuscripts has subscription:
το παρον τετραβαγγελον εκομισθει εκ της πατμω βιβλιοθηκης, παρ' εμου ιωσηφ γεωργειρηνη ταπεινου αρχιεπισκοπου σαμου και επεδωθει τω ευσεβεστατω και κραταιω βασιλει λοδοβικω τω μεγα εν ετουσ χυ αχος μαρτιου κε.
The same subscription appears in the codex 294.

Text 

The Greek text of the codex is a representative of the Byzantine text-type. Kurt Aland the Greek text of the codex did not place in any Category.
According to the Claremont Profile Method it represents textual family Kx in Luke 1, in Luke 20 it has a mixture of the Byzantine text-families. In Luke 10 no profile was made.

History 

This manuscript together with codex 294 were brought from Patmos and given to Louis XIV in 1686 by Joseph Georgeirenus, Archbishop of Samos. It was added to the list of New Testament manuscripts by Scholz (1794-1852). 
It was examined and described by Paulin Martin. C. R. Gregory saw the manuscript in 1885.

The manuscript is currently housed at the Bibliothèque nationale de France (Gr. 86) at Paris.

See also 

 List of New Testament minuscules
 Biblical manuscript
 Textual criticism

References

Further reading 

 Jean-Pierre-Paul Martin, Description technique des manuscrits grecs, relatif au Nouveau Testament, conservé dans les bibliothèques des Paris (Paris 1883), p. 67

Greek New Testament minuscules
12th-century biblical manuscripts
Bibliothèque nationale de France collections